The list of ship launches in 1757 includes a chronological list of some ships launched in 1757.


References

1757
Ship launches